Quinlan's Covered Bridge, also called the Lower Covered Bridge, and Sherman Covered Bridge is a wooden covered bridge that crosses Lewis Creek in Charlotte, Vermont on Monkton Road.  It was listed on the National Register of Historic Places in 1974.  It is one of nine 19th-century Burr arch covered bridges in the state.

Description and history
Quinlan's Covered Bridge is located in a rural area of southeastern Charlotte, at a point where Monkton Road arrives from the south to meet Lewis Creek Road and Spear Street on opposite sides of Lewis Creek. Each truss has, in addition to diagonal braces and vertical posts, a pair of timber arches bolted to it. It has a gabled roof, and its exterior is clad in vertical board siding, which extends around to the inside of the portals. It rests on stone abutments faced in concrete.

The builder is unknown, but most likely the same builder as the Sequin Covered Bridge upstream.  The name "Lower Bridge" was because it is downstream of the Sequin (or "Upper") bridge.  This is common in Vermont where multiple bridges crossed the same body of water in the same town.  The name "Quinlan" is attributed the family of the same name that held land in the area.  The name "Sherman" comes from the owner of a sawmill that was located adjacent to the bridge site.

In 1949 or 1950 steel beams were installed under the deck to strengthen it. The bridge underwent reconstruction in 2013.

See also
 
 
 
 List of covered bridges in Vermont
 National Register of Historic Places listings in Chittenden County, Vermont
 List of bridges on the National Register of Historic Places in Vermont

References

Buildings and structures in Charlotte, Vermont
Bridges completed in 1849
Covered bridges on the National Register of Historic Places in Vermont
Truss bridges in the United States
Wooden bridges in Vermont
Bridges in Chittenden County, Vermont
Tourist attractions in Chittenden County, Vermont
1849 establishments in Vermont
National Register of Historic Places in Chittenden County, Vermont
Road bridges on the National Register of Historic Places in Vermont
Burr Truss bridges in the United States